Fahrudin Omerović ( born 26 August 1961) is a Bosnian former footballer who played as a goalkeeper. He serves assistant coach at Fenerbahçe. In Turkey, Omerović became known as Fahrettin Ömerli while playing there; he took up Turkish citizenship as a naturalized citizen.

Club career
Born in Doboj, SR Bosnia and Herzegovina, Omerović begin his career in FK Sloboda Tuzla, making his debut in the Yugoslav First League in the 1980–81 season. He spent four seasons playing in Tuzla, when in summer 1984 he was transferred to FK Partizan where he will become the main goalkeeper for the following 8 seasons.  With Partizan he won two Yugoslav championships, two Yugoslav Cups, and one Supercup.

After the dissolution of SFR Yugoslavia, he made a transfer to Kocaelispor in 1992. He played Kocaelispor for 4 years. After he moved to İstanbulspor and played there for 2 years. Finally he retired in 1998-99 season.

International career
He was capped eight times for Yugoslavia between 1989 and 1992, including a spot in Yugoslavia's 1990 World Cup roster where he spent the tournament as an unused backup to Tomislav Ivković. Even after the independence of Bosnia and Herzegovina, Omerović was included in the Yugoslav squad for Euro 1992, but the nation would be suspended due to the Yugoslav Wars.

In 1996, he played 3 matches for the newly established Bosnian national team. His final international was an October 1996 World Cup qualification match against Croatia.

Coaching career
After retiring, he stayed in Turkey where he has undertaken a coaching career.  Initially he worked as assistant of Safet Sušić and Aykut Kocaman, before beginning his career as a main coach working in clubs such as İstanbulspor, Malatyaspor and Ankaraspor.

Honours

Club
Yugoslav First League: 1985–86, 1986–87
Yugoslav Cup: 1989, 1992
Yugoslav Supercup: 1989

References

External links

 Fahrudin Omerović at TFF.org

1961 births
Living people
People from Doboj
Bosnia and Herzegovina emigrants to Turkey
Naturalized citizens of Turkey
Association football goalkeepers
Yugoslav footballers
Yugoslavia international footballers
1990 FIFA World Cup players
Bosnia and Herzegovina footballers
Bosnia and Herzegovina international footballers
Dual internationalists (football)
FK Sloboda Tuzla players
FK Partizan players
Kocaelispor footballers
İstanbulspor footballers
Yugoslav First League players
Süper Lig players
Bosnia and Herzegovina expatriate footballers
Expatriate footballers in Turkey
Bosnia and Herzegovina expatriate sportspeople in Turkey
Bosnia and Herzegovina football managers
Fenerbahçe S.K. (football) non-playing staff
İstanbul Başakşehir F.K. non-playing staff
Bosniaks of Bosnia and Herzegovina